Major general Ameen Abdullah al-Waeli (1962 – 27 May 2021) was a Yemeni military officer and held the rank of major general. He served as commander of the 6th military region of Yemeni Army of the internationally-recognized government forces. He is among the most senior members of the government forces to have been killed in the Yemeni Civil War. He was killed during battles with Houthis in Marib in 2021.

References

Yemeni generals
21st-century Yemeni military personnel
Yemeni military officers
Yemeni military personnel killed in the Yemeni Civil War (2014–present)
People from Dhamar Governorate
2021 deaths
1962 births
Yemeni Military Academy alumni